Galina Miklínová (July 28, 1970) is a Czech illustrator and director of cartoons. She graduated from UMPRUM in Prague in 1997. She also studied at the University of Humberside in the United Kingdom. She won many awards as both an author of cartoons and an illustrator of books. She often works with a Czech poet Pavel Šrut.

Works 

Filmography

Biograf (1997)
Bajky ze zahrady (2003)
O Kanafáskovi (2004)
Hra (2004)
Nešťastné narozeniny Péti Fotky (2005)
O Kanafáskovi II. (2008)

External links 
 Bio-, filmo- and bibliography with a list of awards, in Czech

1970 births
Living people
Czech illustrators
Czech animators
Czech women animators
Czech women illustrators
Czech film directors
Czech women film directors